Basma is an Israeli Arab local council in the Wadi Ara area of Haifa District. The local council was formed in 1995 through the consolidation of the villages of Barta'a West, Ein as-Sahala, and Muawiya; Basma is an acronym of the villages' names. Basma's jurisdiction area covers 3,956 dunams.

History

Each of Basma's villages were under the administration of a Mukhtar (village headman), who was appointed by the Interior Ministry until 1992, when the Interior Ministry established the Nahal Iron regional council, including Basma's villages and five others. The locals objected to the administrative arrangement, claiming that the council was established without consulting the locals and their wishes were not considered. Some of the villages had already sought an independent municipal status but were rejected. Most of the agricultural land was not included in the council's jurisdiction area, all of the council members were Jewish and it was given a Hebrew name. Following an appeal to the High Court of Justice, the state promised to dismantle the council and establish a regular regional council, where each village had an elected local committee. The appeal was cancelled but the locals appealed again, demanding an independent status for each village. The Ministry of Interior declared that the local concerns had been considered, but were not consistent with the ministry's policy of not creating local councils for small villages in fear of spending public money, and the High Court of Justice rejected the appeal. Eventually, in order to allay local concerns, the Interior Ministry established an investigative committee to examine other options, and in 1996, decided to split the regional council into two local councils: Ma'ale Iron, and Basma.

In 2003, Basma was included in a wide plan of the Interior Ministry to merge local and regional councils in the region of Hadera. According to the plan, Basma was to be united with Arara and Kfar Qara, while Mu'awiya will be moved to Ma'ale Iron. The plan was rejected by all councils.

Education
Basma has three elementary schools for each village and two middle schools and high schools in Barta'a and Mu'awiya. There are 23 kindergartens in the council: 10 in Barta'a, 8 in Mu'awiya and 5 in Ein a-Sahala.

See also
 Arab localities in Israel

References

External links
 Survey of Western Palestine, Map 8:   IAA, Wikimedia commons 
 Welcome To Barta'a
 Welcome To Khirbat 'Ayn al-Sahla
 Welcome To Mu'awiya

1995 establishments in Israel
Arab localities in Israel
Local councils in Haifa District
Populated places established in 1995